The Cook Islands is a third tier rugby union playing nation. They began playing international rugby in early 1971. Thus far, the Cook Islands have not made an appearance at any of the World Cups.

History
In 1924 a scratch team of Rarotongan boys, including the late Sir Albert Henry, played the All Black Invincibles on their way to the United Kingdom. The game was drawn 0–0. 

The Cook Islands played their first official international on September 1, 1971 against Western Samoa, losing 24 points to 18. The Cook Islands went on to win against Wallis and Futuna the next day and then lose again to Samoa the day after.

The next time the Cook Islands played was nine years later in 1980, in a close game against a touring Italian side; the Cook Islands won by 15 – 6. Three years later they again played Samoa, again losing. The next match for the Islanders wasn't until 1996, when they played Papua New Guinea. Since then, they play regularly against them and fellow Pacific sides Niue and Tahiti.

While Niue and the Cook Islands are not members of the Pacific Tri-Nations competition, they can supply players for the Pacific Islanders'. The first and still sole player from Cook Islands to have represented the Pacific Islanders was Tu Tamarua, in 2004.

The best Cook Islands rugby players often play in New Zealand where there is a large Cook Island population.

The Cook Islands entered the play-off round 4 against Tonga for a berth at the 2007 Rugby World Cup, but suffered heavy losses by 77–10 at home and 90–0 away, in 2006, being eliminated.

The Cook Islands entered recently Oceania Cup, but were surprisingly eliminated by Niue who beat them 18–7 at Rarotonga.

The 2013 Oceania Cup hosted by Papua New Guinea saw the Cook Islands record wins over Tahiti, Soloman Islands and the final hosts Papua New Guinea. Cook Islands played and lost to Fiji in 2014 for the last spot (Oceania 1) at the 2015 Rugby World Cup.

Overall Records
Below is table of the representative rugby matches played by an Cook Island's national XV at test level up until 25 July 2021.

World Cup record

Current squad
Cook Islands squad for the 2023 Rugby World Cup Oceania qualifiers.
 Head Coach:  Nathan Robinson

Notable players
 Tommy Hayes
 Albert Henry
 Koiatu Koiatu
 Paul Koteka
 Dave Rennie
 Tu Tamarua
 Stan Wright
 Mike Beckham

See also
 Rugby union in the Cook Islands
 Cook Islands national rugby sevens team

References

External links
  
 Cook Islands at the IRB Official Site
 Cook Islands Rugby Union on Facebook 

Rugby union in the Cook Islands
Oceanian national rugby union teams
Rugby union, men